Amrit Desai is a pioneer of yoga in the West, and one of the few remaining living yoga gurus who originally brought over the authentic teachings of yoga in the early 1960s. He is the creator of two brands of yoga, Kripalu Yoga and I AM Yoga, and is the founder of five yoga and health centers in the US. His yoga training programs have reached more than 40 countries worldwide and over 8,000 teachers have been certified.
 
Homegrown Gurus (2013) states: "Although Desai has not received scholarly attention, he has arguably been one of the most influential and sought-after figures in the development of Hatha Yoga in America over the last 40 years."

Biography

Early life

Born on 16 October 1932, Amrit Desai is the second son of Chimanlal, a village merchant, and Buribhen Desa in Pratappura in Gujarat, India. When Amrit was ten, the family moved to Halol. At age 15, he met his guru, Swami Kripalvananda (Bapuji), a wandering Shaivite monk and kundalini yoga master who was offering free talks on the Bhagavad Gita in Halol. 

Desai taught himself yoga asana (postures) from a chart he found tacked to the wall of the local gym. He started teaching others outside the cowshed where his guru lived. After the swami observed him teaching one day, he allowed him to witness his private sadhana. The swami went into a trance-like state and began to perform movements unlike anything he had seen on the asana charts. Desai recalls: "The pranic energy became so strong his body was hurled across the room with tremendous force. As I watched in awe, he was dancing, weaving in and out of complicated asanas."

After studying engineering and training with the Indian Air Force in Madras, Desai returned to Halol and took a job teaching art at the local high school. He married his betrothed, Urmila Shah, in January 1955. The couple moved to Ahmedabad a year later where he earned his art diploma over the next four years. They had three children between 1959 and 1968. He saved enough money to travel to America, and in February 1960, arrived at the Philadelphia College of Art with only enough money in his pocket to cover his first semester's tuition and rent. By teaching yoga and washing dishes alongside his studies, he saved enough money to bring his wife and infant son to the US two years later. Desai is a vegetarian and practices occasional fasting.

Art career

Graduating in 1964 with a degree in fine arts and design from the Philadelphia College of Art, he took a job with a textile firm. His watercolor paintings won awards at art shows including at the Philadelphia Museum of Art. He created distinct textures and patterns with razor blades and eye-droppers. While still an art student, he played the flute in a "Music of India" concert at the Commercial Museum (Philadelphia Trade and Convention Center) in 1961.

Yoga pioneer

Desai started teaching yoga in the early 1960s in the Philadelphia area while still an art student. In 1966 during his first visit to India since coming to the US, Swami Kripalvananda gave him initiation and further instruction in kundalini yoga. Returning to the US, he left in 1966 his job to form The Yoga Society of Pennsylvania and teach yoga full-time. In 1970, he claimed to have had a Kundalini awakening experience that revealed to him that Patanjali's Yoga Sutras are a manual for the practice of Ashtanga Yoga rather than mere philosophy. Out of this experience Desai created a form of hatha yoga called Kripalu Yoga, named in honour of his guru. His Meditation in Motion approach is based on the practical application of Patanjali's Ashtanga Yoga in daily life. The system combines two traditional paths of yoga: the rigorous discipline of Ashtanga yoga with the path of initiation and surrender that is Kundalini yoga. In this system, the student begins with the practice of wilful discipline and gradually moves on to the more advanced practice of surrender to prana.

In 1966, the not-for-profit Yoga Society of Pennsylvania was formed, renamed in 1972 as the Kripalu Yoga Fellowship. By 1970, it had trained 44 teachers and had grown to 150 Yoga classes, attended by more than 2,500 students per week, in southeast Pennsylvania, Delaware, and southern New Jersey, making it one of the largest Yoga organisations at that time. 

In 1972, the first Kripalu Ashram was founded in Sumneytown, PA. The 50-acre property was purchased to fulfill the growing demand among students for a yogic lifestyle experience. Desai reduced his teaching to once per week to make time for higher yoga practice. The ashram also became a program center that provided the volunteer residential staff and teachers the in-depth study and practice of yoga, along with a yogic lifestyle. A variety of health, yoga and spiritual trainings and programs were offered. As the demand for programs grew, the residential staff grew from 37 to 70. In 1974, Desai spent three months in seclusion at a small cottage on the property that came to be known as Muktidham. Upon his return, he was greeted by 350 disciples, mostly dressed in white, some of whom had travelled from as far away as Detroit, Chicago and Montreal for the celebration. 

In 1976, an additional ashram in Summit Station, PA was opened to accommodate the growth in program participants and volunteer staff. As a result, the program center grew to provide a greater variety of programs, and the residential staff grew to 150. In 1983, the Kripalu Center for Yoga and Health was founded in Lenox, MA. The staff of Summit Station was transferred to Lenox, and soon grew to 350 full-time resident staff. By 1994 Kripalu Yoga teachers were teaching in 50 states and 45 countries worldwide, and it was described as the world's largest yoga and health center. The Amrit Yoga Institute in Salt Springs, FL was founded in 2001, and currently operates as an ayurvedic healing and yoga retreat center. Regular yoga teacher trainings are offered in the Integrative Amrit Method, or the I AM techniques.
In 2014, he co-founded the International University of Yoga and Ayurveda that offers accredited training programs in the US and in India. To date, Desai is the founder of five yoga and health centers in the US, and co-founder of a university of Ayurvedic sciences.

A Shaktipat lineage

Yogi Desai was initiated into the secrets of Shaivite kundalini yoga by his guru, Swami Kripalu (Kripalvananda), a master of tantric sadhana. There are numerous documented accounts of energetic transmission or shaktipat experienced in his presence.

D. R. Butler describes a meditation led by Desai at a week-long retreat with about 200 attendees at the 1973 ICSA Yoga Convocation, where Desai was an unannounced guest:

Dr David Frawley stated:
 

In the afterword to Ancient Wisdom, Modern Master, Mickey Singer described a meeting with Desai during which his heart chakra was "permanently opened" by "the simple touch of Amrit's hand."

Controversy
The Kripalu Center for Yoga and Health was an Ashram. One of the spiritual practices that the single residents were expected to practice was celibacy (brahmacharya). Although sex within marriage was condoned at the ashram, after his third child was born in 1968, Desai declared that he would now practice celibacy too. A large celebration was held for this event. So important was this practice of celibacy that occasionally meetings were held and residents were asked to divulge anyone they thought might have violated that sacred practice. As a result, some residents were ejected from the community.  The irony was that the two most senior members of the community, including Desai, were practising adultery.  After years of infidelity with numerous people, in 1994, it was revealed and admitted that Desai had had sexual contact with at least three female resident disciples and was forced to resign his position as Spiritual Director.

Then in an open letter to the Kripalu community, Desai stated, "More than anything I want Kripalu to remain a spiritual home for many. I want you to know that we came to this decision together… I deeply regret any suffering I have caused to the people directly involved and to the entire Kripalu family."

Post-Kripalu years and the Amrit Yoga Institute

When Michael A. Singer, a long-time supporter and host of Desai's seminars, heard that Desai had left the Kripalu community, he invited him and his wife to spend some quiet time living with the Temple of the Universe community in Alachua, Florida. The Desais arrived in December 1994 and stayed on the property for the better part of three years.

Desai resumed teaching in 1996 at the original Kripalu Ashram in Sumneytown, Pennsylvania. After a couple of years, mostly in that state, the Desai family relocated to Salt Springs, Florida in 2002, where Yogi Desai currently teaches at the Amrit Yoga Institute, a beautiful lakeside retreat on the banks of Lake Kerr in the Ocala National Forest. Amrit Yoga Institute is an ashram where the guru-disciple relationship continues to flourish and residents enjoy the benefits of a traditional yogic lifestyle. Programs of varying length are offered for yoga teacher training, ayurveda, and recovery.

Kripalu, while no longer an ashram, continues to operate and is presently one of the largest yoga and health centers in North America, offering a wide range of programs and professional trainings in health, spirituality, yoga, and more.

Humanitarian work
Paul Harris Fellow – In 2011, Yogi Amrit Desai received this award from the Rotary Foundation of Rotary International, in Naples, Florida, "in appreciation of tangible and significant assistance given for the furtherance of better understanding and friendly relations among peoples of the world."

Bhuriben Trust – The Yug Prabha newspaper, Halol, India stated in a 2007 article, "Yogishri Amrit Desai was honored in his home town of Halol for his humanitarian works known to offer scholarships to the poor and approximately 5,000 women are helped financially through the Bhuriben Trust he established... Helpless and poor patients receive free medicines and medical treatment... [H]e has financed the building of the new children’s school in Halol."

Awards

 Doctor of Yoga Science, 1974 – From Jagadaguru Shankaracharya Maharaj, Dwarka, spiritual leader of Hinduism, for outstanding contributions to humanity.
 Yogacharya, 1980 – From Swami Kripalvananda, Desai's guru and founder of Kayavarohan Tirtha Shiva Temple, Malav Ashram, and Lord Lakulish Yoga Institute, in recognition of years of intensive study, teachings and practice of philosophy and spiritual principles of yoga.
 Jagadacharya, 1986 – From the World Religious Parliament, New Delhi, India, established by Swami Vivekenanda in 1894. This honourable title, equivalent to Jagadaguru Shankaracharya, was awarded to five world-renowned teachers for spreading Hindu philosophy and wisdom worldwide.
 Maharishi, 1986 – From the 105-year-old Sadguru Swami Gangeshwaranandji Maharaj, Udasin, chancellor of Udasin Sanskrit University, Benares, founder of 12 ashrams in India and 600 Ved Mandirs.
 Vishwa Yoga Ratna, 1987 – Conferred by the Vishwa Unnayan Samsad (World Development Parliament of India) to 10 world-renowned teachers from 10 countries (India, USA, England, Australia, New Zealand, Italy, Belgium, Switzerland, Brazil, France), this one-time award was presented by the President of India in recognition of lifelong dedication and service in the field of Yoga. Desai was selected to represent the USA.
 Padma Vibhushan Nomination, 1992 – Nominated by the late Prime Minister of India, Chandra Shekhar, with a positive response from then Prime Minister Narasimha Rao for 1993.
 Unity in Yoga Plaque, 1993 – In appreciation for years of dedicated services to yoga in the Americas. Presented by Unity in Yoga Teachers Association celebrating 100 years of Yoga in America.

Post-Kripalu

 Patanjali Award, 2010 – For Excellence in Yogic Research and Teachings in North America, from the Association of Ayurvedic Professionals of North America (AAPNA). 
 Inaugural Fellow, Council for Yoga Accreditation International (CYAI), 2012 – The council recognised four inaugural Fellows who have demonstrated extraordinary achievement and contribution to the field of Yoga.
 Maharishi Sandipani Award, 2013 – From the Ujjain Yog Life Society International, at the 4th International Yog Conference, held in January 2014 in Ujjain, Madhya Pradesh, India.
 International Yoga Grand Master, 2013 – From Jagat Guru Amrta Suryananda Maharaj (recipient of Padma Shri). The only previous recipients of this award were B.K.S. Iyengar and Dr. Nagendra, SVYASA University, Bangalore.

Publications

Books

 Kripalu Yoga: Meditation-in-Motion (1985)
 In the Presence of a Master (1992)
 Amrit Yoga: Explore, Expand, Experience (2004)
 Amrit Yoga and the Yoga Sutras (2010)
 Love and Bliss: Meditations on the Art of Living (2014)
 Yoga of Relationships (2015)
 Embodying the Power of the Zero Stress Zone (2017)
 Letters from Swami Kripalu (2017)

Media

 Ecstatic Chanting Vol I and II
 Integrative Amrit Method Yoga Level I and II
  Yoga Nidra: Healing and Rejuvenation MP3 (2005)
 Yoga Nidra: Journey to the Heart MP3 (2013)
 I AM Yoga Nidra led by Yogi Amrit Desai – YouTube
  "Return to the source" with Yoga Nidra led by Yogi Amrit Desai – YouTube

References

Further reading
Yogi Amrit Desai has been the subject of several biographies, including:

 Lila Ivey, Bikram Choudhury and Mickey Singer (2012). Ancient Wisdom, Modern Master: The Story of Yogi Amrit Desai. MahaMedia Inc.
 Amrit Desai and Christine Deslauriers (1992). In The Presence of the Master. Kripalu Publications. 
 Sukanya Warren, Peter Mellen, and Francis Mellen (1982). Gurudev: The Life of Yogi Amrit Desai. Kripalu Publications.

External links
 Amrit Yoga Institute
 AmritDesai.com

1932 births
Living people
20th-century Hindu religious leaders
People from Gujarat
American yoga teachers
People from Panchmahal district
Modern yoga pioneers

Indian yoga gurus
Modern yoga gurus